Sati is a fantasy novel by Christopher Pike. It was first published in September 1990.

Plot summary
Michael is a trucker who picks up a blonde, blue-eyed, young female hitchhiker, Sati, in the Arizona desert.  Sati claims that she is God, to Michael's disbelief, and sets out to prove this by spreading this message through organized meetings, and convinces many people of her divinity.  She is challenged numerous times, once by a fundamentalist preacher, but emerges unscathed in his claims.  Meanwhile, Michael sets out to find out where this "Sati" came from, only to find nothing.  The book opens as such:

"I once knew this girl who thought she was God.  She didn't give sight to the blind or raise the dead.  She didn't even teach anything, not really, and she never told me anything I probably didn't already know. On the other hand, she didn't expect to be worshiped, nor did she ask for money. Given her high opinion of herself, some might call that a miracle.  I don't know, maybe she was God.  Her name was Sati, and she had blonde hair and blue eyes."

Influences
Like many other books written by Pike, this book is clearly influenced by The Bible, and Hindu philosophy as well as modern day Christianity, Hinduism and Buddhism, as shown in Sati's philosophy and persona which is a mixture of these beliefs. The name may be derived from a Hindu goddess named "Sati", but it is never mentioned in the book.

There are similarities between the character Sati and the similarly named Sita from Pike's The Last Vampire series written later: both are blonde, blue-eyed young females with supernatural powers, and have beliefs similar to those of Hinduism (Sita practises Hinduism).

See also

 The Last Vampire

References

Sati
Sati
Contemporary fantasy novels
Novels set in Arizona
Fictional cult leaders